Yuanwu Keqin (Japanese: Engo Kokugon) (1063–1135) was a Han Chinese Chan monk who compiled the Blue Cliff Record.

Biography
Yuanwu Keqin was born into the Le family of Pengzhou, Sichuan, in 1063. His family was well educated in Confucianism, a sign of acquaintance with the Chinese civil service. Nevertheless, Yuanwu Keqin choose a Buddhist monastic path and entered Miaoji Monastery (a Buddhist monastery in Pengzhou. He ended his formal studies under Wuzu Fayan (1047-1104) when he was in his forties. Yuanwu Keqin was closely involved in the literati circles.

Blue Cliff Record

Yuanwu Keqin belonged to the Linji school. He was the teacher of Dahui Zonggao, who introduced the Hua Tou practice.

Starting from the year 1112 on, Yuan-wu started to lecture on the One Hundred Old Cases and Verses [to the Cases] compiled by Xuedou Zhongxian (980–1052). These lectures resulted in the Blue Cliff Record.

The Blue Cliff Record gives clear instructions about the correct approach to kōan. Yuanwu went as far as to annotate the poems line by line to make clear the correct reading of Xuedou's appended verses, which are complex, because of the rich use of symbolism and the allusions to Chinese secular literature and to Chan history.

According to the Chán-tradition, the Blue Cliff Record gained such a popularity, that Dahui Zonggao burned all the copies he could lay hands on, and the wooden printing blocks.

References

Sources

Further reading
Cleary, Thomas & Cleary, J.C. (1977) The Blue Cliff Record, Shambhala Publications, 
Cleary, J. C.; Cleary, Thomas (1994), Zen Letters: Teachings of Yuanwu, Shambhala Publications, 
Cleary, Thomas (2000) Secrets of the Blue Cliff Record: Zen comments by Hakuin and Tenkei, Shambhala

External links
 Hidden Treasure

1063 births
1135 deaths
Chinese spiritual writers
Chan Buddhist monks
Song dynasty Buddhist monks
Chinese Zen Buddhists
Song dynasty writers
Writers from Chengdu